Agustín Eizaguirre Ostolaza (7 October 1897 – 28 November 1961) was a Spanish footballer who played as a goalkeeper. He competed in the football tournament of the 1920 Summer Olympics with the Spain team winning the silver medal without making an appearance. At club level, he played for Real Sociedad.

Career
Eizaguirre was born in Zarautz in 1897. He was a Real Sociedad goalkeeper from 1912 to 1925, making 70 appearances. He played in the inaugural match at Atotxa Stadium in October 1913. With the Union of Clubs, one of two competing football federations in Spain at the time, he played in an international match against France in 1913. In 1920, he participated at the 1920 Summer Olympics with the Spain team without making an appearance. He retired at the age of 28.

After football
After his retirement from playing, Eizaguirre set up a sports equipment store.

Personal life and death
Eizaguirre's son Ignacio was also a football goalkeeper and played for the Spain national team.

References

External links
 

1897 births
1961 deaths
Footballers from the Basque Country (autonomous community)
Spanish footballers
Association football goalkeepers
Basque Country international footballers
Footballers at the 1920 Summer Olympics
Olympic footballers of Spain
Olympic medalists in football
Medalists at the 1920 Summer Olympics
Olympic silver medalists for Spain
Real Sociedad footballers